Citebase Search was an experimental, semi-autonomous citation index for free, online research literature created at the University of Southampton as part of the Open Citation Project. It harvested open access e-prints (most author self-archived) from OAI-PMH compliant archives, parses and links their references and indexes the metadata in a Xapian-based search engine. Citebase went live in 2005 and ceased operation in 2013.

More than three-quarters of the papers indexed were author self-archived in the ArXiv archive, which includes physics, maths and computer science. Some (published) biomedical papers were indexed from BioMed Central and PubMed Central.

See also
EPrints
Citeseer
NASA ADS
Stanford Physics Information Retrieval System

References

External links
Archive of last available version of citebase home page (December 2012)

Internet search engines
Bibliographic databases and indexes
Scholarly search services